Perko is a surname. Notable people with the surname include:

John Perko (American football, born 1914) (1914–1973), American football player
John Perko (American football, born 1918) (1918–1984), American football player
Kenneth Perko (born 1943), Knot theorist
Rok Perko (born 1985), Slovenian alpine skier
Tom Perko (born 1954), American football player

See also
Perko pair, knot theory